The Hirth 2702 and 2703 are a family of in-line twin cylinder, two stroke, carburetted aircraft engines designed for use on ultralight aircraft and especially two seat ultralight trainers, single seat gyrocopters, and small homebuilts. It is manufactured by Hirth of Germany.

Development
The 2703 was developed as a competitor to the  Rotax 503 and is similar to the Rotax powerplant in being a two-cylinder in-line engine, with dual capacitor discharge ignition. The 2702 was developed from the 2703 as a de-rated version.

Both the 2702 and 2703 use free air or fan cooling, with Bing 34mm slide carburetors. The cylinder walls are electrochemically coated with Nikasil. Standard starting is recoil start. Reduction drive systems available are the G-50 gearbox with reduction ratios of 2.16:1, 2.29:1, 2.59:1, 3.16:1, or 3.65:1, or a multi-element cog belt drive. A tuned exhaust and electric start are optional.

The engines runs on a 50:1 pre-mix of unleaded 93 octane auto fuel and oil.

Variants
2702
Twin-cylinder in-line, two stroke, aircraft engine with a single Bing 34mm slide carburetor. Produces  at 5500 rpm and has a factory rated TBO of 1200 hours. Still in production.
2703
Twin-cylinder in-line, two stroke, aircraft engine with dual or optionally a single Bing 34mm slide carburetor. Produces  at 6200 rpm and has a factory rated TBO of 1000 hours. The 2703 has been largely supplanted in production by the Hirth 3202, but in 2009 was still available as a special order from the factory.

Applications
2702
Airfer Transan
Brutsche Freedom 40
Flightstar
Hy-Tek Hurricane 103
ISON Airbike
Preceptor N3 Pup
Spacek SD-1 Minisport

2703
Airfer Transan
Airmotive EOS 001
American Sportscopter Ultrasport 254
CGS Hawk
Exkluziv Joker
Falconar Golden Hawk
Kolb Firestar
RemSchetMash Robust
US Light Aircraft Hornet

Specifications (2702)

See also

References

External links
Official 2702 page
Official 2703 page on Archive.org

Hirth aircraft engines
Air-cooled aircraft piston engines
Two-stroke aircraft piston engines